Bilal Khilji (born 10 September 1975) is a Pakistani first-class cricketer who played for Bahawalpur cricket team.

References

External links
 

1975 births
Living people
Pakistani cricketers
Bahawalpur cricketers
Pakistan National Shipping Corporation cricketers
Water and Power Development Authority cricketers
Service Industries cricketers
Pakistan Customs cricketers
Multan cricketers
Baluchistan cricketers
Cricketers from Bahawalpur